The 2019 D1NZ season was the sixteenth D1NZ series; the premier drifting series of New Zealand. The season began at Trustpower Baypark Stadium on January 12 and concluded at Manfeild: Circuit Chris Amon on April 27. Darren Kelly won the main championship, whilst Michael Thorley won the Pro-Sport class.

Teams and drivers

Pro Series

Pro-Sport

Calendar

Championship standings

Pro

Pro Sport

References

External links
 

D1NZ